The following is a list of Mayors of Tartu, Estonia.

External links
 Mayors of Tartu

 List of mayors of Tartu
Tartu

et:Tartu linnapea#Ajalugu